This is a list of episodes for the Macross Delta anime series (2016).

The series used twelve musical themes: two openings and ten endings.

Episodes
Episodes are named as "Missions". A typical episode title consists of a Japanese word written in kanji or hiragana, followed by an English word romanized in katakana.

Films

Delta episodes
Macross Delta